The Clemson Tigers football program is a college football team that represents Clemson University in the Atlantic Division of the Atlantic Coast Conference (ACC). The Tigers compete as part of the National Collegiate Athletic Association (NCAA) Division I Football Bowl Subdivision. The team has had 25 head coaches since it began play in the 1896 season. Since October 2008, Dabo Swinney has served as Clemson's head coach.

The team has played in 1,050 games over 116 seasons. In that time, eight coaches have led Clemson to postseason bowl games: Jess Neely, Frank Howard, Charley Pell, Danny Ford, Ken Hatfield, Tommy West, Tommy Bowden, and Swinney. Five coaches have won conference championships with the Tigers: John Heisman won two as a member of the Southern Intercollegiate Athletic Association; Howard won two as a member of the Southern Conference; and Howard, Pell, Ford, Hatfield, and Swinney won a combined 14 as a member of the Atlantic Coast Conference.  In 1981, Ford led the Tigers to the national championship. Swinney has guided the Tigers to six ACC championships and four national title appearances, winning the 2016 and 2018 championships, while losing the 2015 and 2019 championships.

Howard is the all-time leader in games coached (295), seasons coached (30), and total wins (165). Heisman has the highest winning percentage, with .833 in his four years at Clemson. Of coaches with more than one season, Hootie Ingram has the lowest winning percentage (.364 in 3 seasons). Of the 25 head coaches who have led the Tigers, Heisman, Jess Neely, Ford, and Howard have been inducted into the College Football Hall of Fame as coaches; Josh Cody was inducted into the Hall of Fame as a player.

Key

Coaches

Notes

References
General

Specific

head coaches
Lists of college football head coaches
Clemson Tigers football coaches